RNLB H F Bailey (ON 694) was the second lifeboat at Cromer in the county of Norfolk to bear the name of H F Bailey. She replaced H F Bailey (ON 670) which had been stationed at Cromer until 1924. In 1936 she became the station's reserve lifeboat and was renamed J B Proudfoot.

Description
The lifeboat was built by J. Samuel Whites at Cowes in the Isle of Wight in 1923. She was powered by a single Weyburn 80 hp petrol engine.

Donor
The Cromer station had four motor-powered lifeboats all called H F Bailey after the donor, Henry Francis Bailey of Brockenhurst, a London merchant who was born in Norfolk and died in 1916.

Service and rescues

References

 

Cromer lifeboats
Watson-class lifeboats